The BAM XS-B26 is a Chinese copy of the Beeman R9. It is available in two calibers: .177 and .22. It is a break barrel type air rifle.

The 26 in B26 is for 26 mm chamber, but it never went into production at 26 mm.
It has a 25 mm chamber. The Beeman R9 has 26 mm, where the B26 does not have the 26 mm chamber.

Now Bam B26 is 26 mm chamber.

References

Air guns